Raja Chatila is a Professor of Robotics, AI and Ethics at ISIR-CNRS and Pierre and Marie Curie University, France. He was named a Fellow of the Institute of Electrical and Electronics Engineers (IEEE) in 2013 for contributions to robot navigation and cognitive robotics.

References

External links

20th-century births
Living people
Syrian roboticists
French roboticists
Artificial intelligence ethicists
Academic staff of Pierre and Marie Curie University
Fellow Members of the IEEE
Year of birth missing (living people)
Place of birth missing (living people)